Castleridge is a residential neighbourhood in the northeast quadrant of Calgary, Alberta. It is located east of the Calgary International Airport and is bounded by 64 Avenue NE to the north, Métis Trail to the west, McKnight Boulevard to the south and Falconridge Boulevard to the east.

Castleridge was established in 1980 on land transferred from the Municipal District of Rocky View to the city in 1961. It is represented in the Calgary City Council by the Ward 5 councillor.

In 2008 the Ahmadiyya Muslim Community opened Baitun Nur, the largest mosque in Canada, in Castleridge.

Demographics

Residents in this community had a median household income of $57,923 in 2000, and there were 19.5% low income residents living in the neighbourhood. As of 2000, 34.7% of the residents were immigrants. A proportion of 8% of the buildings were condominiums or apartments, and 24.8% of the housing was used for renting.

See also
List of neighbourhoods in Calgary

References

External links
Falconridge/Castleridge Community Association

Neighbourhoods in Calgary